Gobius senegambiensis is a species of marine fish from the family Gobiidae, the true gobies. It is native to the Atlantic Ocean from Morocco to Angola as well as the islands in the Gulf of Guinea. It is found in inshore waters on sandy bottoms. This species can reach a length of  SL.

The species name senegambiensis refers to Senegambia, a historic region of West Africa.

References

senegambius
Taxa named by Jan Marie Metzelaar
Fish of the Atlantic Ocean
Marine fish of Africa
Fish of Angola
Tropical fish
Fish described in 1919